A Small Place is a work of creative nonfiction published in 1988 by Jamaica Kincaid. A book-length essay drawing on Kincaid's experiences growing up in Antigua, it can be read as an indictment of the Antiguan government, the tourist industry and Antigua's British colonial legacy.

The book, written in four sections, "combines social and cultural critique with autobiography and a history of imperialism to offer a powerful portrait of (post)colonial Antigua."

History and background
In 1493, Christopher Columbus became the first European to visit Antigua on his second voyage. He named it Antigua after the Santa Maria de la Antigua, an icon found in Seville's cathedral. Sir Thomas Warner from England was able to colonize the island in 1632 by starting plantations that included tobacco and sugarcane. Warner also introduced slavery to the island. Slaves from West Africa worked on these plantations. Antigua became known as the English Harbourtown for its great location in the Caribbean. In 1834 slavery was finally abolished, but black peoples' economic conditions failed to improve due to “land shortages and the universal refusal of credit”.

In her work, Jamaica Kincaid presents an anti-imperialist dialogue which is particularly critical of tourism and government corruption, both of which became prevalent after independence. She criticizes Antigua's dependence on tourism for its economy. Kincaid also mentions the damage caused by the 1974 earthquake, which destroyed many buildings. The author also explains how many people in office were charged with all forms of corruption. This social critique led to it being described as "an enraged essay about racism and corruption in Antigua" by one reviewer.

Major ideas

Tourism as a neo-colonial structure

In the first section of A Small Place, Kincaid employs the perspective of the tourist in order to demonstrate the inherent escapism in creating a distance from the realities of a visited place. Nadine Dolby dissects the theme of tourism in A Small Place and places Kincaid's depiction of tourism in a globalized context that justifies Kincaid's strong feelings toward it. Dolby corroborates Kincaid's depiction of the tourist creating separation by "othering" the locale and the individuals that inhabit it. Furthermore, the tourist industry is linked to a global economic system that ultimately does not translate into benefits for the very Antiguans who enable it.

The tourist may experience the beauty on the surface of Antigua while being wholly ignorant of the actual political and social conditions that the Antiguan tourism industry epitomizes and reinforces. Corinna Mcleod points out the disenfranchising nature of the tourism industry in its reinforcement of an exploitative power structure. In effect, the industry recolonizes Antigua by placing locals at a disenfranchised and subservient position in a global economic system that ultimately does not serve them.

Racism and legacies of colonialism

While Kincaid expresses anger towards slavery, colonialism and the broken Antiguan identity that it has left in its wake, she avoids retreating to simple racialization in order to explain the past and present, for doing so would further "other" an already marginalized group of people.  Kincaid sheds light on the oppressive hierarchical structures of colonialism, which is still evident in the learned power structures of present-day, post-colonial Antigua.

According to academic Suzanne Gauch, while Kincaid acknowledges the racial justifications used by white colonists to institute oppressive policies during Antigua's colonial era, she also attempts to transcend the notions of an inescapable racialized past for Antigua. In doing so she attempts to shape readers’ view of Antigua by creating a sense of agency.

Critical reception

Positive

Kincaid's work has received mixed reviews, both positive and negative. Some of her overall reactions in the United States were characterized as immediate and enthusiastic.  The anger that people felt from her attacking nature in her reading simultaneously lent certain strength to her argument about the postcolonial condition of the Antiguan people by manifesting itself as an authentic and emotional account. She uses her anger about the situation as a way to definitively inform readers about the postcolonial Antiguan daily life. Being an enraged essay focusing on racism and the effects of colonialism, some people account for the most consistent and striking aspect of her work to be what critic Susan Sontag calls her "emotional truthfulness". Sontag describes Kincaid's writing as "poignant, but it's poignant because it's so truthful and it's so complicated. ... She doesn't treat these things in a sentimental or facile way."

Negative reception

In 1988, A Small Place was criticized as a vitriolic attack on the government and people of Antigua. New Yorker editor Robert Gottlieb refused to publish it. According to Jamaica Kincaid: Writing Memory, Writing Back to the Mother she was not only banned unofficially for five years from her home country, but she voiced concerns that had she gone back in that time, she worried she would be killed.

Jane King, in A Small Place Writes Back, declared that "Kincaid does not like the Caribbean very much, finds it dull and boring and would rather live in Vermont. There can really be no difficulty with that, but I do not see why Caribbean people should admire her for denigrating our small place in this destructively angry fashion." Moira Ferguson, a feminist academic, argued that as "an African-Caribbean writer Kincaid speaks to and from the position of the other. Her characters are often maligned by history and subjected to a foreign culture, while Kincaid herself has become an increasingly mainstream American writer."

References

External links
 College Literature
 postcolonialweb.org

1988 essays
Political literature
Economy of Antigua and Barbuda
Antigua and Barbuda literature
British Leeward Islands
History of Antigua and Barbuda
Novels by Jamaica Kincaid
African-American novels